MTN Syria is one of the two only mobile operators in Syria, the other being Syriatel. MTN Syria was previously known as "Areeba". It offers GSM and 3.5G broadband 4G (LTE) services.

In 2020, MTN Group decided to sell the remaining of 75% of its share in MTN Syria to the Saudi-owned TeleInvest Ltd, which already owns 25% of the company.

Statistics (October 2012)

References

External links
MTN Syria
MTN Group

Companies based in Damascus
Telecommunications companies of Syria